Dana Blankstein-Cohen (born March 3, 1981) is the executive director of the Sam Spiegel Film and Television School. She was appointed by the board of directors  in November 2019.  Previously she was the CEO of the Israeli Academy of Film and Television. She is a film director, and an Israeli culture entrepreneur.

Biography 
Dana Blankstein was born in Switzerland in 1981 to theatre director Dedi Baron and Professor Alexander Blankstein. She moved to Israel in 1983 and grew up in Tel Aviv.

Blankstein graduated from the Sam Spiegel Film and Television School, Jerusalem in 2008 with high honors. During her studies she worked as a personal assistant to directors Savi Gabizon on his film Nina's Tragedies and to Renen Schorr on his film The Loners.  She also directed and shot 'the making of' film on Gavison's film Lost and Found. Her debut film Camping competed at the Berlin International Film Festival, 2007.

Film and academic career 
After her studies, Dana founded and directed the film and television department at the Kfar Saba municipality. The department encouraged and promoted productions filmed in the city of Kfar Saba, as well as the established cultural projects, and educational community activities.

Blankstein directed the mini-series "Tel Aviviot" (2012). From 2016-2019 was the director of the Israeli Academy of Film and Television.

In November 2019 Dana Blankstein Cohen was appointed the new director of the Sam Spiegel Film and Television School where she also oversees the Sam Spiegel International Film Lab. In 2022, she spearheaded the launch of the new Series Lab and the film preparatory program for Arabic speakers in east Jerusalem.

Filmography 
Tel Aviviot (mini-series; director, 2012)
Growing Pains (graduation film, Sam Spiegel; director and screenwriter, 2008)
Camping (debut film, Sam Spiegel; director and screenwriter, 2006)

References



External links 

 15 Best International Film Schools Ranked 2022,  The Hollywood Reporter, Alex Ritman, August  5, 2022 
 Sam Spiegel Film School Bows Series Lab With Netflix, ViacomCBS - Variety, Elsa Keslassy, Feb 7, 2022
 Despite coronavirus, Jerusalem Sam Spiegel Film School thrives, Israel Culture- The Jerusalem Post (jpost.com), Hannah Brown, JANUARY 27, 2021
 Sam Spiegel Film School names new director, Israel News - The Jerusalem Post (jpost.com), Hannah Brown, August 14th 2019
 Israel, Abu Dhabi funds and Sam Spiegel film school sign cooperation agreement | News | Screen ,screendaily.com, 21 Sep. 2020
 Israeli and UAE film bodies sign agreement, plan regional film festival, Israel News - Haaretz.com, Nirit Anderman, Sep. 21, 2020
 Henry Winkler, Aleeza Chanowitz Star in 'Chanshi' for Israel's HOT - Variety, Naman Ramachandran, Feb 28, 2022
 Netflix CEO tells Israeli students he's looking for 'local stories' | The Times of Israel, JESSICA STEINBERG, 22 June 2022
 Alex Camilleri’s ‘Zejtune’ leads Jerusalem Sam Spiegel, Pitch Point winners | News | Screen (screendaily.com), BEN DALTON25 ,JULY 2022

1981 births
Israeli women film directors
Living people
Film people from Tel Aviv